Canada is an unincorporated community in Marion County, Kansas, United States.  It is named for many Canadian immigrants coming to the area.  It is located between Hillsboro and Marion about 0.5 miles south of the intersection of Nighthawk Road and U.S. Route 56 highway, southwest of the Hillsboro Cove of the Marion Reservoir.

History

Early history

For many millennia, the Great Plains of North America was inhabited by nomadic Native Americans.  From the 16th century to 18th century, the Kingdom of France claimed ownership of large parts of North America.  In 1762, after the French and Indian War, France secretly ceded New France to Spain, per the Treaty of Fontainebleau.

19th century
In 1802, Spain returned most of the land to France.  In 1803, most of the land for modern day Kansas was acquired by the United States from France as part of the 828,000 square mile Louisiana Purchase for 2.83 cents per acre.

In 1854, the Kansas Territory was organized, then in 1861 Kansas became the 34th U.S. state.  In 1855, Marion County was established within the Kansas Territory, which included the land for modern day Canada.

David Christie, former Speaker of the Senate of Canada, sent his sons to buy  near the future site of Canada. Many Canadian immigrants moved to the area, thus was the source of the community.  Canada was platted on December 15, 1883, but never incorporated.  Canada had a Post Office from 1884 to 1954.

As early as 1875, city leaders of Marion held a meeting to consider a branch railroad from Florence.  In 1878, Atchison, Topeka and Santa Fe Railway and parties from Marion County and McPherson County chartered the Marion and McPherson Railway Company.  In 1879, a branch line was built from Florence to McPherson, in 1880 it was extended to Lyons, in 1881 it was extended to Ellinwood.  The line was leased and operated by the Atchison, Topeka and Santa Fe Railway.  The line from Florence to Marion, was abandoned in 1968.  In 1992, the line from Marion to McPherson was sold to Central Kansas Railway. In 1993, after heavy flood damage, the line from Marion through Canada to McPherson was abandoned and removed.  The original branch line connected Florence, Marion, Canada, Hillsboro, Lehigh, Canton, Galva, McPherson, Conway, Windom, Little River, Mitchell, Lyons, Chase, Ellinwood.

A post office existed in Canada from February 20, 1884 to February 28, 1954.

20th century
From 1964 to 1968, the Marion Reservoir was constructed north of Canada.

21st century
In August 2015, a film crew for an advertising agency in Toronto, Ontario came to Canada to interview residents and give away New Balance shoes for a Canadian TV commercial.

Geography
Canada is located at coordinates 38.3541802, -97.1128030 in the scenic Flint Hills and Great Plains of the state of Kansas.  It is approximately halfway between Marion and Hillsboro.

Area attractions
 Marion Reservoir, 1 mile (2 km) north of Canada.  The Hillsboro cove is closest to Canada.  Exits along US-56: French Creek cove (Limestone Road), Hillsboro cove (Nighthawk Road), Overlook and Dam (Old Mill Road), Marion cove and Cottonwood Point cove (Pawnee Road).

Education
The community is served by Marion–Florence USD 408 public school district.  All students attend schools in Marion.  The high school is a member of T.E.E.N., a shared video teaching network between five area high schools.
 Marion High School, located in Marion.
 Marion Middle School, located in Marion.
  Marion Elementary School, located in Marion.

Media

Print
 Marion County Record, county newspaper from Marion.
 Hillsboro Free Press, free newspaper for greater Marion County area.

Infrastructure

Transportation

Utilities
 Internet
 Satellite is provided by HughesNet, StarBand, WildBlue.
 TV
 Satellite is provided by DirecTV, Dish Network.
 Terrestrial is provided by regional digital TV stations.
 Electricity
 Community and Rural areas provided by Flint Hills RECA.
 Water
 Community and Rural areas provided by Marion County RWD #4 (map).

References

Further reading

 Beginnings in the Canada Community; H.J. Siebert; Marion Record. September 23, 1937.

External links

 
 Marion County cemetery list, archive of KsGenWeb
 Marion County history bibliography,  Marion County school bibliography, Kansas Historical Society
 Marion County maps: Current, Historic, KDOT
 Topo Map of Marion / Aulne / Canada area, USGS

Unincorporated communities in Kansas
Unincorporated communities in Marion County, Kansas
Populated places established in 1883
1883 establishments in Kansas